Tammari may refer to:

 Tammari people
 Tammari language

See also
 Tamari (disambiguation)